Jeffry H. Larson, Ph.D., LMFT, CFLE, is a retired Professor of Marriage and Family Therapy at Brigham Young University. 
He is the author of Should We Stay Together? A Scientifically Proven Method for Evaluating Your Relationship and Improving its Chances for Long Term Success (San Francisco: Jossey-Bass, 2000) and the E-book entitled The Great Marriage Tune-Up Book: A Proven Program for Evaluating and Renewing Your Relationship (March 2004), among others.

He obtained his B.S. and M.S. degrees in Psychology from BYU and a Ph.D. in Marriage and Family Therapy from Texas Tech University. He is a licensed marriage and family therapist, and   the former chair of the Utah State MFT Licensing Board. He is the former chairperson and professor of the Marriage and Family graduate program at BYU. He is the author of over 70 scholarly journal articles and book chapters. He was awarded the Distinguished Alumnus Award by Texas Tech University in 2001.

Prior to joining the BYU faculty Larson was on the faculty of Montana State University.

Personal life
Dr. Larson was born in 1949.

References

External links
A list of articles by Larson

Year of birth missing (living people)
Living people
Latter Day Saints from Montana
Brigham Young University alumni
Brigham Young University faculty
American psychotherapists
Texas Tech University alumni
Relationship education
Latter Day Saints from Texas
Latter Day Saints from Utah